The 2005 Georgetown Hoyas football team was an American football team that represented Georgetown University during the 2005 NCAA Division I-AA football season. The Hoyas tied for second-to-last in the Patriot League.

In their 13th and final year under head coach Bob Benson, the Hoyas compiled a 4–7 record. Maurice Banks, Robert LaHayne, Michael Ononibaku and Kim Sarin were the team captains.

The Hoyas were outscored 292 to 116. Georgetown's 2–4 conference record tied for fifth place out of seven in the Patriot League standings.

Georgetown played its home games at Multi-Sport Field on the university campus in Washington, D.C.

Schedule

References

Georgetown
Georgetown Hoyas football seasons
Georgetown Hoyas football